Blunt-leaved senna is a common name for several plants and may refer to:

Senna artemisioides, native to Australia
Senna obtusifolia, globally distributed in warm climates
Senna italica, native to Africa and Asia